The 2007 Valdosta State Blazers football team was an American football team that represented Valdosta State University as a member of the Gulf South Conference (GSC) during the 2007 NCAA Division II football season. In their first year under head coach David Dean, the team compiled a 13–1 record (7–1 against conference opponents) and finished second in the GSC. The team advanced to the NCAA Division II playoffs and defeated , 41–3, in the championship game.

The Blazers played their home games at Bazemore–Hyder Stadium in Valdosta, Georgia.

Schedule

References

Valdosta State
Valdosta State Blazers football seasons
NCAA Division II Football Champions
Valdosta State Blazers football